Jeff Hodgson is a Canadian former soccer player, businessman, and current head coach for Madonna University women's soccer team.

Playing career 
Hodgson began his career in 1995 with Tucson Amigos in the USISL Premier League. In 1996, he signed with Arizona Sandsharks of the Continental Indoor Soccer League. During his tenure with Arizona he appeared in 22 matches. After the demise of the CISL he signed with Detroit Rockers of the National Professional Soccer League. During his four year stint with Detroit he appeared in 66 matches, and recorded one goal. In 2003, he returned to Canada to sign with London City of the Canadian Professional Soccer League. The following year Hodgson created the Windsor Border Stars franchise to compete in the Canadian Professional Soccer League. He held several roles within the organization as active player, and team manager. He helped Windsor win two Open Canada Cups, and one AISL Championship. After five seasons in the CPSL the club faced financial problems which resulted in the league revoking the clubs franchise.

Managerial career 
His first managerial job was as assistant coach for Western Michigan University men's soccer team. On February 4, 2010 he was appointed the head coach for Madonna University women's soccer team. In 2011, former Windsor teammate Filip Rocca was awarded a Windsor franchise in the Canadian Soccer League, and brought back Hodgson to jointly head coach the Windsor Stars with Steve Vagnini.

References 

Living people
Sportspeople from Windsor, Ontario
Soccer people from Ontario
Canadian soccer coaches
Canadian soccer players
Canadian expatriate soccer players
Expatriate soccer players in the United States
Canadian expatriate sportspeople in the United States
Tucson Amigos players
Arizona Sandsharks players
Detroit Rockers players
Windsor City FC players
USL League Two players
Continental Indoor Soccer League players
National Professional Soccer League (1984–2001) players
Canadian soccer chairmen and investors
London City players
Canadian Soccer League (1998–present) players
Canadian Soccer League (1998–present) managers
Association football midfielders
Year of birth missing (living people)